S. cinnamomea may refer to:
 Sporophila cinnamomea, the chestnut seedeater, a bird species found in Argentina, Brazil, Paraguay and Uruguay
 Synallaxis cinnamomea, the stripe-breasted spinetail, a bird species found in Trinidad, Tobago, Venezuela and Colombia
 Syrnola cinnamomea, a sea snail species found off Japan

See also 
 Cinnamomea (disambiguation)